Phillip Ross Burrows  (born 25 April 1980 in Wellington) is a field hockey player from New Zealand, who earned his first cap for the national team, nicknamed The Black Sticks, in January 2000. The striker is New Zealand's top field goal scorer and was named 2003 New Zealand Player of the Year.

Since his debut, he has competed in over 120 international games for his country and appeared in three Summer Olympics: in 2004 in Athens, in 2008 in Beijing and in 2012 in London.

He has played club hockey in The Netherlands since 2004, initially for Breda and since the summer of 2005, for HC Rotterdam. In the summer of 2010 he went to Braxgata in Belgium. In 2012 he returned to the Netherlands to play for HGC.

International senior tournaments
 2000 – Sultan Azlan Shah Cup
 2000 – Olympic Qualifying Tournament
 2001 – World Cup Qualifier
 2002 – World Cup
 2002 – Commonwealth Games
 2003 – Sultan Azlan Shah Cup
 2003 – Champions Challenge
 2004 – Olympic Qualifying Tournament
 2004 – Olympic Games
 2004 – Champions Trophy
 2005 – Sultan Azlan Shah Cup
 2006 – Commonwealth Games
 2006 – World Cup Qualifier
 2006 – World Cup
 2007 – Champions Challenge
 2008 – Olympic Games
 2010 − Commonwealth Games
 2012 – Olympic Games

References

External links
 

1980 births
Living people
New Zealand male field hockey players
Male field hockey forwards
Olympic field hockey players of New Zealand
Field hockey players at the 2004 Summer Olympics
Field hockey players at the 2008 Summer Olympics
Field hockey players at the 2012 Summer Olympics
2002 Men's Hockey World Cup players
2006 Men's Hockey World Cup players
2010 Men's Hockey World Cup players
2014 Men's Hockey World Cup players
Commonwealth Games medallists in field hockey
Commonwealth Games bronze medallists for New Zealand
Commonwealth Games silver medallists for New Zealand
Field hockey players at the 2002 Commonwealth Games
Field hockey players at the 2006 Commonwealth Games
Field hockey players at the 2010 Commonwealth Games
Field hockey players at the 2014 Commonwealth Games
Field hockey players from Wellington City
Members of the New Zealand Order of Merit
HC Rotterdam players
HGC players
Men's Hoofdklasse Hockey players
Men's Belgian Hockey League players
Expatriate field hockey players
New Zealand expatriate sportspeople in the Netherlands
New Zealand expatriates in Belgium
Medallists at the 2002 Commonwealth Games
Medallists at the 2010 Commonwealth Games